Ōtoshi (大歳神, Ōtoshi-no-kami; lit. "Great-Age God") or Nigihayahi (饒速日尊 Nigihayahi-no-mikoto), commonly known: Toshigami (年神, lit. "Year God") or Ōtoshi (大年神, Ōtoshi-no-kami; lit. "Great-Year God") is a Kami of the Shinto religion in Japan.

He is the son of the Shinto deity Susanoo and the female deity Kamu'ō-ichi-hime (神大市比売), and also the older brother of Uka-no-mitama (宇迦之御魂神, Uka-no-mitama-no-kami), commonly known as Inari (稲荷神, Inari-no-kami). Kamu'ō-ichi-hime is related to Kushinadahime, Susanoo's first wife, as they are both descendants of Ōyamatsumi (大山津見神). Kamu'ō-ichi-hime is his daughter, while Kushinadahime is the daughter of his two children, Tenazuchi and Ashinazuchi.  Ōyamatsumi (大山津見神) is the half-brother of Susano'o. Also, he is the father of Mitoshi (御年神, Mitoshi-no-kami/ Otoshi-no-kami) by his wife Kaguyo-hime (香用比売) and the grandfather of Wakatoshi (若年神, Wakatoshi-no-kami), son of Hayamato  (羽山戸神, Hayamato-no-kami).

Toshigami are thought to be deities of the year believed to bring with each New Year. Toshigami are also thought to be the spirits of ancestors.

His shrines are scattered throughout Western Japan where he is venerated. The following popular and significant shrines are:

 Katsuragi Mitoshi/ Katsuragi Mitose Jinja (葛木御歳神社), in the city of Goseshi, Nara Prefecture, Japan – is the nation's main shrine of the dedicated and celebrated to him
 Ōtoshimi'oya Jinja (大歳御祖神社), part of the compound of Shizuoka Sengen Jinja (静岡浅間神社), in Aoi-ku, city of Shizuoka, Shizuoka Prefecture, Japan
 Hidaichi-no-miya Minashi Jinja (飛騨一宮水無神社, commonly: 水無神社 Minashi Jinja), in the city of Takayama, Gifu Prefecture, Japan in the former ancient Japanese nation of Hida
 Ōyamato Shrine (大和神社, Ōyamato Jinja), in the city Tenri, Nara Prefecture, Japan – the city was briefly the capital of Japan during the reign of Emperor Ninken. The right hall of the compound is venerated to him, while the middle hall to the Shinto deity Yamato-no-Ōkunitama (倭大国魂神/ Nihon Shiki: 日本大国魂神 – lit. "Yamato, Spirit of the Great Nation" = (ancient name of Japan)) which this deity theoretically is the same deity as Ōkuninushi (大国主神, Ōkuninushi-no-kami), and the left hall to the Shinto deity to Yachihoko (八千戈大神, Yachihoko-no-Ōkami), another name of the deity Ōkuninushi (大国主神, Ōkuninushi-no-kami).

Genealogy 
Toshigami fathered many other Shinto deities. The children of his wives were:

 Ino-hime (伊怒比売), the daughter of the Shinto deity Kamikusubi (神活須毘神), their children:
Ōhokuni-mitama/ Ōkuni-mitama (大国御魂神, Ōhokuni-mitama/ Ōkuni-mitama -kami) – the meaning of his name is "Spiritual Deity of the Land of the Nation", or "Soul of the Nation" and "Pillar (Master/ Lord) of the Great Nation"
Kara (韓神, Kara-kami, lit. "Deity of Korea") – deity worshipped and introduced by immigrants (known by the Japanese as "Toraijin (渡来人)") of a clan from the ancient Korean kingdom of Baekje, His shrine is Sonokara-kami-no-Yashiro/ Sonokara Misha (園韓神社) located at the northeastern part of the town of Shuzei-chō/ Chikara-machi (主税町), opposite the Ministry of the Imperial Household (宮内省 Kunai-shō), in the district of Kamigyō-ku (上京区), of the palace complex of Heian-kyō, former capital and city of Kyoto, Kyoto Prefecture, Japan
Sofuri (曾富理神, Sofuri-kami) – deity worshipped and introduced by immigrants (known by the Japanese as "Toraijin (渡来人)") of a clan from the ancient Korean kingdom of Shilla/ Silla, also located in the palace complex of Heian-kyō, former capital and city of Kyoto, Kyoto Prefecture, Japan
Shirahi (白日神, Shirahi-no-kami) – deity of halo/ light/ corona of the Sun
Hijiri (聖神 Hijiri-no-kami) – deity of knowledge of farming and agriculture by the Sun 
 
 Kaguyo-hime (香用比売), their children:
Ohokaguyama-tomi/ Ōkaguyama-tomi (大香山戸臣神, Ohokaguyama-tomi/ Ōkaguyama-tomi -no-kami)
Mitoshi (御年神, Mitoshi-no-kami/ Otoshi-no-kami) – an important deity
 
 Amechikarumizu-hime/ Amechikarumidzu-hime (天知迦流美豆比売), their children:
Okitsu-hiko (奥津日子神/ 澳津彦神, Okitsu-hiko-no-kami) – god of the blaze and hearth
Okitsu-hime (奥津比売命 Okitsu-hime-no-mikoto/ 澳津姫神, Okitsu-hime-no-kami) – other name is Ohohe-hime/ Ōhe-hime (大戸比売神, Ohohe-hime/ Ōhe-hime-no-kami) – goddess of the kitchen and stove, hearth of the kitchen
Ohoyamakuhi/ Ōyamakuhi (大山咋神, Ohoyamakuhi/ Ōyamakuhi -no-kami) – other name is Yamasu'e-no-ohonushi/ Yamasu'e-no-ōnushi (山末之大主神, Yamasu'e-no-ohonushi/ Yamasu'e-no-ōnushi -no-kami). The mountain-deity of Mount Hiei (比叡山 Hiei-zan) is a mountain to the northeast of Kyoto, lying on the border between the Kyoto and Shiga Prefectures, Japan. Also, he is the celebrated deity of both the shrine of Hiyoshi Taisha, located in Ōtsu, Shiga, Shiga Prefecture, Japan and the shrine of Matsuno'o Taisha/ Matsu'o Taisha in the south of the Arashiyama district of Kyoto, Kyoto Prefecture, Japan
Niwa-tsuhi (庭津日神, Niwa-tsuhi-no-kami) – the meaning of his name is "Light who Shines/ Illuminates the Garden" – is the deity of the mansion or house
Asuha (阿須波神, Asuha-no-kami) – deity of the mansion or house and the fourth of the five column deities known as "Ikasuri/ Zama (座摩神, Ikasuri/ Zama -no-kami)" venerated in the northern office (situated in the centre) in the western courtyard of the Department of Divinities (神祇官 Jingi-kan) of Heian Palace, former capital and city of Kyoto, Kyoto Prefecture, Japan
Hahiki (波比岐神/ 波比祇神/ 婆比支神, Hahiki-no-kami) – deity of the mansion or house and the fifth of the five column deities known as "Ikasuri/ Zama (座摩神, Ikasuri/ Zama -no-kami)" venerated in the northern office (situated in the centre) in the western courtyard of Department of Divinities (神祇官 Jingi-kan) of Heian Palace, former capital and city of Kyoto, Kyoto Prefecture, Japan
Kaguyama-tomi (香山戸臣神, Kaguyama-tomi-no-kami)
Hayamato (羽山戸神, Hayamato-no-kami) – an important male deity, who governs the mountain ridges and lower parts of the mountains. The husband of the goddess Ōgetsu-hime (大気都比売神, Ōgetsu-hime-no-kami)
Niwataka-tsuhi (庭高津日神, Niwataka-tsuhi-no-kami) – the deity of the mansion or house
Ohotsuchi/ Ōtsuchi (大土神, Ohotsuchi/ Ōtsuchi -no-kami) – other name is Tsuchi-no-mi'oya (土之御祖神, Tsuchi-no-mi'oya-no-kami) – deity of the earth and soil, protector deity of the land

The grandchildren of Toshigami through his wife Amechikarumizu-hime, from his son Hayamato (羽山戸神) and his wife Ōgetsu-hime (大気都比売神, Ōgetsu-hime-no-kami):

Wakayamaku'i (若山咋神, Wakayamaku'i-no-kami) – deity of the mountains
 Wakatoshi (若年神, Wakatoshi-no-kami), other names: (若歳神/ 稚年神, Wakatoshi-no-kami)
 Wakasana-me (若狭那売神, Wakasana-me-no-kami) – female youth deity planting of the fields
Mizumaki/ Midzumaki (弥豆麻岐神, Mizumaki/ Midzumaki -no-kami) –  deity of watering and irrigation
Natsutakatsuhi (夏高津日神, Natsutakatsuhi-no-kami) – other name: Natsuno-me (夏之売神, Natsuno-me-no-kami) – deity of the Sun shining highest in the summer
Aki-bime (秋毘売神, Akibi-me-no-kami) – other name: Aki-hime (秋比女神, Akihime-no-kami) – goddess of autumn
Kukutoshi (久久年神, Kukutoshi-no-kami) – other name: Fuyutoshi (冬年神, Fuyutoshi-no-kami) – meaning "the stems of rice about to/ that will grow"
Kukuki-wakamurotsunane (久久紀若室葛根神, Kukukiwakamurotsunane-no-kami) – other names: Wakamurotsunane (若室葛根)/ Fuyuki-wakamurotsunane (冬記若室葛根神, Fuyukiwakamurotsunane-no-kami) – the intention is to build a new room and tie it with a rope of kudzu. It is considered to build a house for the Harvest Festival (新嘗祭, Ni'inamesai)

See also 
 Seven Lucky Gods

Shinto kami
Agricultural gods
Japanese folk religion
Food deities
Onmyōdō deities
Kunitsukami